Night Divides the Day: The Music of the Doors is the thirteenth album of pianist George Winston and ninth solo piano album, released in 2002. It features only piano covers of rock band The Doors. The Doors' keyboard player Ray Manzarek stated: "I love this CD; George has captured the essence of the Doors and added his own unique voice". The name of the album comes from the line "Night divides the day", from The Doors' song "Break on Through (To the Other Side)". Rhapsody praised the album, calling it one of their favorite cover albums.

Track listing

Charts

References

External links
 Liner notes

2002 albums
George Winston albums
The Doors tribute albums
Dancing Cat Records albums